Trionfi is a trilogy of cantatas by German composer Carl Orff:

 Carmina Burana
 Catulli Carmina
 Trionfo di Afrodite

Carmina Burana is by far the most famous of the three.

Cantatas
Compositions by Carl Orff